Jack Grossman (November 1, 1910 in Poland- February 6, 1983 in Hollywood, Florida) was a professional Polish American football player who played wide receiver for four seasons for the Brooklyn Dodgers. He attended Rutgers College. He was not drafted. In 1932 selected for 2nd Team All-NFL.

References

1910 births
1983 deaths
American football wide receivers
Brooklyn Dodgers (NFL) players
Rutgers Scarlet Knights football players
Polish players of American football
Polish emigrants to the United States